ACT Theatre (originally A Contemporary Theatre) is a regional, non-profit theatre organization in Seattle, in the US state of Washington. Gregory A. Falls (1922–1997) founded ACT in 1965 and served as its first Artistic director; at the time ACT was founded he was also head of the Drama Department at the University of Washington. Falls was identified with the theatrical avant garde of the time, and founded ACT because he saw the Seattle Repertory Theatre as too specifically devoted to classics.

Facility
ACT is located in Kreielsheimer Place, at 700 Union Street in Downtown Seattle. The building, which also includes the 44 unit, moderate-income Eagles Apartments, is the historic Eagles Auditorium Building. Previously part of the Washington State Convention and Trade Center (to which it is connected via internal tunnel), the building was remodeled into theater spaces and apartments and renamed in honor of a major gift from the Kreielsheimer Foundation. There are two mainstage theater spaces, each with a capacity of about 390 seats. The Gregory A. Falls Theatre, located below street level, has a rectangular thrust stage. Above ground, the former Eagles Auditorium hall (now known as the Allen Theatre) is an arena or "in-the-round" venue.

Complying with landmark ordinances, the Allen Theatre retains the Eagles Auditorium's gilded balcony, ornate ceiling, and crystal chandeliers, though some of this is obscured by the HVAC and lighting systems. The decision to convert this famous lecture hall and performance venue from a proscenium stage to theater-in-the-round was, according to Misha Berson, "the most controversial aspect of the renovation". The proscenium stage from which Martin Luther King Jr. once spoke, and on which the Grateful Dead performed, "is now just a painted relic in the background."

The facility also includes the  Bullitt Cabaret and several other smaller spaces.

History

ACT was founded by Gregory A. Falls in 1965, providing Seattle with "a serious alternative to summer stock theater." They staged their first performance July 9, 1965. ACT was originally in a 454-seat thrust-stage theater in Queen Anne Hall, now home to On the Boards. Falls remained as artistic director until 1988, when he was succeeded by Jeff Steitzer, then in 1995 by Peggy Shannon.

After a lengthy and difficult search for a larger space, ACT moved into its new Kreielsheimer Place facility in 1996, and presented its first play there on September 1 of that year. However, Shannon's productions at the new facility were not well received by the critics or the public. Shannon resigned in 1997, leaving ACT in debt for the first time in its history, and with subscriptions having fallen from 11,400 in 1996 to 9,000 in 1997. Her successor, Gordon Edelstein, revived the company's critical and popular reputation, bringing such noted performers as actresses Julie Harris and Jane Alexander and singer songwriter Randy Newman, as well as experimental director Joanne Akalaitis and composer Philip Glass. Several ACT premieres went on to successful runs in New York. However, costs rose accordingly, and ACT's debts mounted. In October 2002, ACT made an offer to Robert Egan, producing director at the Mark Taper Forum in Los Angeles, to become their new artistic director, but by the time the 2003 season was approaching, ACT had a US$1.7 million debt and was in no position to honor their offer. They were in serious danger of folding. Subscriptions dropped to 7,500.

Donations (including $500,000 Boeing chairman Phil Condit), some scaling back, and a successful 2003 season under artistic director Kurt Beattie saved the day, sparing ACT the fate visited upon Seattle's comparably prominent Empty Space Theatre in the same period. By the 2006 season, ACT was back to venturesome programming, including Martin McDonagh's black comedy The Pillowman and local writer Elizabeth Heffron's Mitzi's Abortion.

John Langs became the artistic director, replacing Kurt Beattie, December 2015. In 2018, Yussef El Guindi  became a Core Company playwright member.

Stature
Over more than four decades, ACT has established itself as one of Seattle's leading theaters. Along with the Cornish Playhouse and Seattle Repertory Theatre ("The Rep"), it is one of the city's three largest playhouses. ACT's Mainstage has presented many world, American, and West Coast premieres.  Numerous productions have gone on to New York City.

ACT is a member of the League of Resident Theatres (LORT). It is also a member of Theatre Puget Sound and is a constituent of Theatre Communications Group. ACT is also a member of the Downtown Seattle Association, Seattle's Convention and Visitors Bureau and Greater Seattle Chamber of Commerce.

Mainstage production history 

Source (except as noted):

Notes

External links
ACT Theatre, official site
A.C.T. Theatre (homonym) in France http://www.aparr.org/marc-feldhun   https://feldhun.webnode.fr/
  Pdt: Marc Feldhun (auteur, acteur, chanteur, musicien, photographe, plasticien)
ACT Theatre History, a comprehensive cross-indexed production history, with programs

Culture of Seattle
Theatres in Washington (state)
Tourist attractions in Seattle
Theatre company production histories